Bernard Schwartz (December 9, 1917 – October 17, 2003) was an American producer. He was nominated for an Academy Award in the category Best Picture for the film Coal Miner's Daughter. 

Schwartz died in October 2003 from complications of a stroke, at the age of 85.

Selected filmography 
 Coal Miner's Daughter (1980)

References

External links 

1917 births
2003 deaths
People from Manhattan
Film producers from New York (state)
American film producers
Deaths from cancer in California